Kayah State Hluttaw is the legislature of the Burmese state of Kayah State. It is a unicameral body, consisting of 20 members, including 15 elected members and 5 military representatives.  As of February 2016, the Hluttaw was led by speaker Hla Htwe of the National League for Democracy (NLD).

The first election for Kayah State Hluttaw was held in November 2010 and all seats elected were from USDP. In 2015 general election, the National League for Democracy (NLD) won the most contested seats in the legislature.

Ethnic Affair Minister is elected from USDP in 2015.

See also
State and Region Hluttaws
Pyidaungsu Hluttaw
Kayah State Government

References

Unicameral legislatures
Kayah State
Legislatures of Burmese states and regions